Severant is a studio album by Jamie Teasdale, aka Kuedo,  of the British dubstep duo Vex'd. The record, released in 2011, was very well received by critics.

Critical reception

Severant was very well received upon release, earning an aggregate 83 out of 100 from Metacritic based on 13 critics. XLR8R scored the album an 8.5 out of ten, and ranked it number 11 on their list of the top 30 best releases of 2011. Fact gave it a 4.5 out of five, later putting it number 16 both on their best albums of 2011 as well as their best albums of the decade so far in 2014. Kuedo subsequently released the studio albums Slow Knife in 2016 and Infinite Window in 2022.

References

2011 debut albums